Newcastle is a city in McClain County, Oklahoma, United States, and part of the Oklahoma City Metropolitan Area. As of the 2020 Census, the population was 10,984.

History

Newcastle became a dot on the map with the opening of a new post office March 26, 1894 and a population of 25. The area had previously been served by the nearby William P. Leeper Post Office, opened in 1888, but closed in 1892 after Leeper was shot in a fencing dispute. The mail office was established on the Minco to Norman road in Section 11, Township 9 North, Range 4 West. Eulalie V. Kelley was the first postmaster. In 1905, postmaster Alonzo Haun moved the facility to his general store in Section 14, Township 9 North, Range 4 West.

Newcastle lay in the Chickasaw Nation. The community's first residents included Choctaw, Chickasaw, and individuals who had married into those tribes. Many were involved in ranching. By 1907, the community had a subscription school, a cotton gin, two stores, and two blacksmiths.

Changes spurred Newcastle's growth throughout the 1920s. In 1920 the town's post office was relocated one mile east on land donated for a public school and a church. In 1922, work started on a South Canadian River bridge. The steel thru-truss bridge with timber flooring was Oklahoma's first federal aid project and a part of the Ozark Trail that was to link Oklahoma City to Amarillo, Texas. Although the trail was never fully completed, the bridge stayed. It opened on April 23, 1923, and cost $321,393.38 to build. The bridge attracted businesses and allowed for the construction of Highway 62 through Newcastle in 1927.

Until the mid-twenties, there was a major river ford at May Avenue that was used whenever the water wasn't too deep. Farmers from Newcastle forged the river with their horses and wagons and traveled up May Avenue on their way to the Oklahoma City Farmer's Market by Western and Reno. Today, only a single section of the old Newcastle Bridge remains alongside the Interstate 44 bridge after having received significant damage during the tornado outbreak of 2013.

During World War II, Newcastle's population stood at approximately 100. During the war five local men gave their lives in defense of their country. Another was captured in the Philippines and spent more than three years as a Japanese prisoner. Soon after Japan surrendered, a tornado swept through Newcastle and destroyed the school and much of the business section. The twister touched down the evening of September 25, 1945, moving from the southwest to the northeast.

The limits of Newcastle essentially comprised the post office and school district until around 1960, when Oklahoma City began annexing huge chunks of land across the river. Incorporated January 18, 1962 as South Newcastle, it expanded its area to some 16,000 acres. Nearby Tuttle and Blanchard expanded as well to attempt to prevent Oklahoma City from trying to annex across the Canadian River. A petition to change the name to Newcastle followed in 1965.

Census records indicate a population of 1,271 in 1970, but by the mid-1970s, Oklahoma City had expanded past SW 74th Street, populating near the Interstate 44 corridor, which spurred growth in Newcastle. The population hit 3,076 in 1980 and 5,434 by 2000. In the 1980s, Newcastle annexed territory that lies near Norman, Oklahoma (north of State Highway 9).

Cotton, ranching, and the dairy industry, once important to the local economy, declined with subdivisions and commercial development taking over former agricultural lands. At the end of the twentieth century the public school system was Newcastle's largest employer. The 2010 census recorded 7,685 residents and the population is estimated to be over 10,000 by 2020.

In January 2019, Newcastle was ranked 36th "Best City to Live" in the United States by 24/7 Wall St., which created a weighted index of over two dozen measures to identify the best city to live in each state.

Tornadoes
April 25, 1893, a massive tornado, reportedly over a mile and a quarter wide at one point, moved northeast along a 15-mile path from northwest of Newcastle through what now is part of Moore, and swept away at least 30 homes. Thirty-three people were killed with 11 people dying in one home, 6 in a second home and 4 in a third home. This tornado was one of at least 5 strong/violent tornadoes in central Oklahoma on this day, but the only one within the immediate Oklahoma City area. The local Norman paper reported that residents of Cleveland County were "scared... as they never have been scared before." In addition, there was a "general scampering from all parts and a hunt for caves was generally inaugurated."

On May 3, 1999, the F5 1999 Bridge Creek–Moore tornado struck parts of Newcastle and resulted in the destruction of several homes in the Newcastle city limits. Greater destruction occurred in Bridge Creek and Moore. This violent, long-lived tornado was the most infamous of nearly 60 tornadoes that struck central Oklahoma during an unprecedented outbreak.

In 2011, a tornado ripped through parts of Newcastle. There were an estimated 160 homes either damaged or destroyed and over 20 businesses damaged. However, there was no loss of life.

On May 20, 2013, another violent tornado damaged parts of Newcastle, including the historic retired Ozark Trail Bridge, growing rapidly as it headed north crossing the Canadian River, and did a large amount of damage to neighboring Moore and southern Oklahoma City.

Geography
Newcastle is located at  (35.145082, -97.360022).

Newcastle is considered to be part of a rapidly growing area of northern McClain and Grady counties. Newcastle also is a part of an area known as the "Tri-City Area" with Tuttle and Blanchard. Newcastle also serves as the largest incorporated community in McClain County.

Demographics

 
As of the census of 2010, there were 7,685 people, 2,839 households, and 2,271 families residing in the city. The population density was 122.9 people per square mile. The racial makeup of the city was 84.53% White, 0.53% African American, 5.26% Native American, 0.32% Asian and 10.30% from other races from two or more races. Hispanic or Latino of any race were 4.31% of the population.

There were 2,540 households, out of which 20.6% had children under the age of 18 living with them, 72.5% were married couples living together, 7.7% had a female householder with no husband present, and 16.5% were non-families. 14.2% of all households were made up of individuals, and 5.5% had someone living alone who was 65 years of age or older. The average household size was 2.75 and the average family size was 3.02.

In the city, the population was spread out, with 20.6% under the age of 18, 7.56% from 18 to 24, 29.58% from 25 to 44, 28.24% from 45 to 64, and 8.39% who were 65 years of age or older. The median age was 38 years. Females represented 49.84% of the population with a median age of 43 and males represented 50.16% of the population with a median age of 39 years.

The median income for a household in the city was $74,167, and the median income for a family was $77,064. Males had a median income of $55,875 versus $37,889 for females. The per capita income for the city was $29,538. About 6.2% of families and 7.2% of the population were below the poverty line, including 4.6% of those under age 18 and 2.9% of those age 65 or over.

Education
The Newcastle School District consists of four school buildings, as well as the Newcastle Early Childhood Center (ECC)(Grades PreK-1),  Newcastle Elementary School(Grades 2-5), Newcastle Middle School (Grades 6-8), and Newcastle High School (Grades 9-12). Schools are located along and just off Main Street/US Highway 62. School colors include a royal blue and black, with the mascot being a "Newcastle Racer".

Students attend classes four days a week (Monday-Thursday).

Library
The Newcastle Public Library is a part of the Pioneer Library System which serves south central Oklahoma City metropolitan area cities and towns.

References

External links
City of Newcastle
Newcastle Chamber of Commerce
Newcastle Public Schools
Newcastle Pacer, local newspaper
Newcastle Public Library

Oklahoma City metropolitan area
Cities in Oklahoma
Cities in McClain County, Oklahoma